Boris Roolaid (born Rosenberg, 3 February 1917 – c. 1942) was an Estonian backstroke swimmer. He competed in the 100 m event at the 1936 Summer Olympics, alongside his younger brother Egon, but failed to reach the final. Roolaid took up swimming in 1932, and between 1935 and 1937 won three national titles. In 1941 both brothers were sent to Soviet labor camps, where they died in 1942–43.

References

External links
 
 

1917 births
1942 deaths
Swimmers from Tallinn
People from the Governorate of Estonia
Estonian male backstroke swimmers
Olympic swimmers of Estonia
Swimmers at the 1936 Summer Olympics
People who died in the Gulag
Estonian people who died in Soviet detention